Roberto Antonio Celedón Fernández (born 31 January 1947) is a Chilean human rights lawyer who is member of the Chilean Constitutional Convention.

References

External links
 BCN Profile

Living people
1947 births
20th-century Chilean lawyers
Christian Left (Chile) politicians
21st-century Chilean politicians
Members of the Chilean Constitutional Convention
Pontifical Catholic University of Chile alumni
University of Talca alumni
People from Talca
21st-century Chilean lawyers